Philip Edwin Herne (born 27 March 1955) is an Australian former motorcycle speedway rider who won the World Team Cup in 1976.

Biography
Born in Ballina, New South Wales, Phil Herne began his speedway career at the Kembla Grange Speedway in Wollongong, south of Sydney, before establishing himself in the British League Division Two with Birmingham Brummies in 1973. The 1974 season was his most successful for the Brummies, with fourteen full maximum scores, and an average of over ten points. In 1975 after finishing third in the Australian Championship at the Sydney Showground Speedway, he moved up to the British League with Newport, moving to Bristol Bulldogs in 1977, before returning to Birmingham for 1978, 1979 and 1980 seasons. He joined Leicester Lions in 1981, spending three seasons with the Lions before moving on to Swindon Robins during the 1983 season, which was his final season before retiring.

Herne made over thirty appearances for Australia and was part of the Australian team that won the World Team Cup in 1976.

Phil Herne was the track reserve for the 1982 Speedway World Pairs Championship final staged at his home track, the Liverpool Speedway in Sydney. He failed to finish his only ride of the night, partnering New Zealand's Mitch Shirra as a substitute for Larry Ross.

Herne is married to Ipswich-born wife Debra and has a daughter, Ella, and sons Lee and Jay, both also professional speedway riders. After speedway, Herne worked as a truck driver for ten years before working as a postman.

World Final appearances

World Pairs Championship
 1982 -  Sydney, Liverpool City Raceway - Reserve - 0pts (1 ride for New Zealand)

World Team Cup
 1976 -  London, White City Stadium (with John Boulger / Phil Crump / Billy Sanders / Garry Middleton) - Winner - 31pt (7)

References

1955 births
Living people
Australian speedway riders
Birmingham Brummies riders
Wolverhampton Wolves riders
Newport Wasps riders
Bristol Bulldogs riders
Leicester Lions riders
Swindon Robins riders
Poole Pirates riders
Ipswich Witches riders
People from the Northern Rivers
Sportsmen from New South Wales